Clusia osseocarpa is a species of flowering plant in the family Clusiaceae. It is found in montane forests of Colombia, Ecuador and Panama. It is threatened by habitat loss.

References

osseocarpa
Flora of Colombia
Flora of Panama
Vulnerable plants
Taxonomy articles created by Polbot